Minghsin University of Science and Technology (MUST) is a private university in Xinfeng Township, Hsinchu County, Taiwan.

History
I. Industrial Junior College Period

MUST was founded in 1966 that was known as Ming Hsin Engineering College (MEC). During this period, there were only some industrial associate degree programs, like Mechanical Engineering, Civil Engineering, Industrial Management, Chemical Engineering, etc..

II. Industrial and Commercial Junior College Period

MEC was renamed to Ming Hsin Institute of Technology and Commerce (MHITC) in 1993. During this period, commercial programs were added, like International Trade, Business Administration, etc..

III. College Period

In 1997, the Ministry of Education agreed MHITC to upgrade to Ming Hsin Institute of Technology (MHIT) with bachelor's degree programs and associate degree programs. During this period, some programs for service industries were added, like Hotel Management, Child Development and Education, etc..

IV. University Period

The Ministry of Education agreed MHIT to upgrade to a full university called Ming Hsin University of Science and Technology on 1 September 2002, and established three colleges: College of Engineering, Management, and Service Industries. In the same year, master's degree programs were added.

Campus

The campus is situated in Hsinchu County covering a complex of 32 acres (320,000 m²) overlooking Hsinchu City. It is close to both Hsinchu Industrial Park and the renowned Hsinchu Science-based Industrial Park.

Organization

A president heads the university, and it is divided into four colleges, each having a variety of departments:

College of Engineering
Department of Mechanical Engineering
Department and Institute of Electrical Engineering
Department and Institute of Electronic Engineering
Department and Institute of Chemical Engineering
Department of Civil Engineering
Department of Opto-Electronic System Engineering
Department of Materials Science and Engineering
Department of Communications Engineering
Department of Environmental Informatics
Department of Computer Science and Information Engineering
Institute of Construction Engineering and Management
Institute of Precision Mechatronic Engineering
College of Management
Department of Industrial Engineering and Management
Department and Institute of Information Management
Department of International Business
Department and Institute of Business Administration
Department of Finance
Institute of Engineering Management
Global Logistics Management Center
College of Service Industries
Department of Hotel Management
Department of Child Development and Education
Department of Leisure Management
Department of Senior Citizen Service Management
Center for Teacher Education
Senior Activity Center
College of Humanities and Social Science
Department of Applied Foreign Languages
Department of Sports Management
Arts Center
Center for Hakka Studies

Notable alumni
 Chiu Ching-chun, Magistrate of Hsinchu County (2009–2018)

See also
 List of universities in Taiwan

External links

Official site
Official site

1966 establishments in Taiwan
Educational institutions established in 1966
Private universities and colleges in Taiwan
Universities and colleges in Hsinchu County
Universities and colleges in Taiwan
Technical universities and colleges in Taiwan